The Community College System of New Hampshire (previously New Hampshire Community Technical Colleges (NHCTC) and prior to that New Hampshire Vocational Technical Colleges (NHVTC)) is an organization of seven public community colleges located throughout New Hampshire. 95% of enrolled students are New Hampshire residents.

The colleges offer over 80 associate degree programs. They also have Project Lead the Way programs where they partner with New Hampshire high schools to allow students to enroll in courses to receive college credits. On January 30, 2008, the Governor and Executive Council unanimously approved changing the names of six member schools. The changes were completed by July 1, 2008.

Member schools 
The colleges are located in the following New Hampshire cities:

References

External links 

 
Public university systems in the United States
Educational institutions in the United States with year of establishment missing